Pelvicachromis is a genus of small, brightly coloured cichlids from tropical West Africa and Central Africa. They typically inhabit soft, acidic water (pH 5.6 – 6.9).

All species form monogamous pairs and use caves as spawning sites. Most are easily spawned in captivity with adequate water quality.

Species
There are currently 11 recognized species in this genus:
 Pelvicachromis drachenfelsi Lamboj, Bartel & dell’Ampio, 2014 
 Pelvicachromis humilis Boulenger, 1916
 Pelvicachromis kribensis Boulenger, 1911 
 Pelvicachromis pulcher Boulenger, 1901 (Rainbow Kribensis)
 Pelvicachromis roloffi Thys van den Audenaerde, 1968
 Pelvicachromis rubrolabiatus Lamboj, 2004
 Pelvicachromis sacrimontis Paulo, 1977 (Often mislabelled as P. pulcher)
 Pelvicachromis signatus Lamboj, 2004
 Pelvicachromis silviae Lamboj, 2013 
 Pelvicachromis subocellatus Günther, 1872
 Pelvicachromis taeniatus Boulenger, 1901

Natural Environment 
Pelvicachromis species inhabit both slow and fast-moving waters in the wild but are only found present in these Central & West African watercourses near to dense underwater vegetation. The water in Pelvicachromis natural environment usually stays around 75° to 79 °F (24° to 26 °C). All described species in the genus have evolved with adaptability at the fore; water quality parameters can vary drastically within this dwarf-cichlids natural range. A species inhabiting different environments and arbitrary alterations must be able to cope with diverse habitats.

In the aquarium
Pelvicachromis comprise part of the arbitrary group aquarists refer to as "dwarf cichlids". They are relatively peaceful cichlids which can be housed with other species in planted, heated tanks.

Pelvicachromis are cave-spawners and will lay their eggs in any cave-like structure such as a clay pot, PVC pipe, coconut shell, etc.  The female will initiate the spawning, often displaying or vibrating in front of the male.  The female will deposit 50–300 eggs in the cave and the pair will guard the eggs.  The eggs hatch in 3–8 days and become free swimming in 5–10 days.

There are yellow, blue, red morphological variations found in the tropical fish hobby; these morphs are a product of natural local population variation.

References 

 
Chromidotilapiini
Cichlid genera